Feliciano López was the defending champion but lost to Radek Štěpánek in the quarterfinals.

Ivan Ljubičić won the title defeating Juan Carlos Ferrero 6–2, 6–4, 7–6(7–5) in the final.

Seeds

Draw

Finals

Top half

Bottom half

External links
 Draw
 Qualifying Draw

BA-CA-TennisTrophy - Singles